Phool Singh Meena is an Indian politician from the Bharatiya Janata Party and a member of the Rajasthan Legislative Assembly representing the Udaipur Rural Vidhan Sabha constituency of Rajasthan.

Early life
Phool Singh Meena was born on 15 August 1959 in a family of Pratihar Meenas in Gadoli, Jahazpur, Bhilwara.

Assets and liabilities
Assets: Rs  ~10 million+
Liabilities: Rs  ~1.2 million+
He is the owner of Pro Pratihaar Company and Counsellor Municipal Corporation & Social Service.

References 

Living people
Bharatiya Janata Party politicians from Rajasthan
Rajasthan MLAs 2013–2018
1958 births
Rajasthan MLAs 2018–2023